Valperga is a comune (municipality) in the Metropolitan City of Turin in the Italian region Piedmont, located about  north of Turin, in the Canavese historical region.

It is home to the Sacro Monte of Belmonte, a site of pilgrimage and worship close to it. The Sacro Monte was built in 1712 at the initiative of the Friar Minor Michelangelo da Montiglio. In 2003, the sanctuary was inserted by UNESCO in the World Heritage List.

References

External links
Official web site for European Sacred Mountains 

Cities and towns in Piedmont
Canavese